Miles and Miles is the major label debut studio album by American electropop and acoustic-pop singer Stephen Jerzak. It was released on June 14, 2011. It was preceded by the lead single, "She Said" featuring Leighton Meester which was released on July 13, 2010. The second single was released along its music video directed by Amy Lynn Straub on July 1, 2011. On March 12, 2013 some unreleased songs that didn't made into the album's final tracklisting along multiple remixes of the first single "She Said" were released on Jerzak's BandPage account under a mixtape called Miles and Miles B-Side.

Composition
The album's sound has been described as "Radio Disney dance-pop", noted to be influenced by both Owl City's electropop and Never Shout Never's teen folk. The record also explores "a more full-fledged pop sound", compared to Jerzak's previous works.

Track listing
Credits taken from Tidal.

Charts

Release history

References

2011 debut albums
Universal Records albums